The 2021 European Triathlon Championships was held in Valencia, Spain from 25 May to 26 September 2021.

Medal overview

Medal table

References

External links 
 Official page

European Triathlon Championships
Triathlon competitions in Spain
European Triathlon Championships
European Triathlon Championships
International sports competitions hosted by Spain
European Triathlon Championships
Sports competitions in Valencia